The following list contains the 420 counties and eight independent cities that comprise the region of Appalachia as defined by the Appalachian Regional Commission, even though the delineation of which Counties said commission places in Appalachia is quite flawed.  The ARC was established by the United States federal government in 1965 to alleviate poverty in the Appalachian region, and currently monitors areas in 13 states.

The list shows the population of each county as of the 2000 U.S. Census; cities in Virginia, which are legally independent of counties, are included within the county with which they were historically associated.  It also gives the following four variables:
3-year average unemployment rate, based on data collected 2006-2008
Per capita market income, as of 2007
Poverty rate, showing what percentage of the county lives below the national poverty rate, as of 2000
Status, the ARC's economic status designation for the county, based on the three variables above.  There are five possible designations:
Distressed — these counties have at least twice the national poverty rate and have a per capita market income 67% of the national average or a three-year average unemployment rate that is twice the national average.
At-Risk — these counties meet two of the following three criteria:  1) 3-year unemployment rate 125% of the national average, 2) per capita market income 67% or less of national average, or 3) poverty rate of 125% or more of the national average
Transitional — these counties are worse than the national average on at least one of the three indicators, but do not meet criteria for "At-Risk" or "Distressed"
Competitive — these counties have a three-year unemployment rate and poverty rate at least equal to the national average, and a per capita market income at least 80% of the national average
Attainment — these counties are at least equal to the national average on all three indicators. To date, only six counties meet Attainment status, with five of them between Alabama and Georgia; the three that are in Georgia (Cherokee, Forsyth, and Gwinnett) are all part of the Atlanta metropolitan area. The other county that has reached Attainment status, as of 2013, is in Virginia.

The national 3-year average unemployment rate for the United States was 5.0% in the period 2006-2008.  The national per capita market income was $32,930 in 2007.  The national poverty rate was 12.4% in 2000.  The 3-year average unemployment rate for the Appalachian region in 2006-2008 was 5.2%.  The region's per capita market income in 2007 was $24,360.  The region's poverty rate was 13.6%.

Alabama's Appalachian counties led all states' Appalachian counties in unemployment (3.8%) and per capita market income ($27,723). Georgia's Appalachian counties had the lowest average poverty rate (9.2%).  Mississippi's Appalachian counties had the highest average unemployment rate at 7.9%, while Kentucky's Appalachian counties had the lowest average per capita market income ($15,690) and the highest average poverty rate (24.4%).

Alabama

Georgia

Kentucky

Maryland

Mississippi

New York

North Carolina

Ohio

Pennsylvania
Although none of the counties in Pennsylvania have reached Attainment status, six of them have reached Competitive stats. Of the six, four of them (Allegheny, Butler, Washington and Westmoreland) are all part of the Pittsburgh metropolitan area, including the city of Pittsburgh. The area has been largely unaffected by the Great Recession and has seen economic growth due to recent activity in the Marcellus Formation.

South Carolina

Tennessee

Virginia
In Virginia, all municipalities incorporated as "cities" are legally separate from the counties in which they are located. As of the 2000 Census, nine cities were part of the federally designated Appalachia region. This number was reduced to eight in 2001, when Clifton Forge relinquished its city charter and reincorporated as a town within Alleghany County.

West Virginia

References

External links
Arc.gov: official Appalachian Regional Commission website

 01
List of Appalachian counties
Lists of counties of the United States
Alabama geography-related lists
Georgia (U.S. state) geography-related lists
Kentucky geography-related lists
Maryland geography-related lists
Mississippi geography-related lists
New York (state) geography-related lists
North Carolina geography-related lists
Ohio geography-related lists
Pennsylvania geography-related lists
South Carolina geography-related lists
Tennessee geography-related lists
Virginia geography-related lists
West Virginia geography-related lists
Society of Appalachia